The 1997 European Amateur Team Championship took place 25–29 June at Portmarnock Golf Club  in Portmarnock, County Dublin, 10 kilometres north-east of the city center of Dublin, Ireland. It was the 20th men's golf European Amateur Team Championship.

Venue 

There were strong winds on the links course during the tournament.

Format 
Each team consisted of six players, playing two rounds of an opening stroke-play qualifying competition over two days, counting the five best scores each day for each team.

The eight best teams formed flight A, in knock-out match-play over the next three days. The teams were seeded based on their positions after the stroke play. The first placed team were drawn to play the quarter final against the eight placed team, the second against the seventh, the third against the sixth and the fourth against the fifth. Teams were allowed to use six players during the team matches, selecting four of them in the two morning foursome games and five players in to the afternoon single games. Games all square at the 18th hole were declared halved, if the team match was already decided.

The eight teams placed 9–16 in the qualification stroke-play formed flight B and the six teams placed 17–22 formed flight C, to play similar knock-out play, with one foursome game and four single games in each match, to decide their final positions.

Teams 
A record number of 22 nation teams contested the event. Teams representing Croatia and Slovakia both took part in the championship for the first time. Each team consisted of six players.

Players in the leading teams

Other participating teams

Winners 
The host nation Ireland won the opening 36-hole competition, with a 39-over-par score of 759, 24 strokes ahead of defending champions Scotland on 2nd place, while the difference between the 2nd and 8th placed teams were 17 strokes. Four of the Irish players finished within the top nine individually. For the first time since 1975, eight-time-winners England, with future professional major-winner Justin Rose in the team, did not make it to the quarter finals, finishing ninth.

There was no official award for the lowest individual score, but individual leader was Keith Nolan, Ireland, with a 7-over-par score of 149, one stroke ahead of fellow country man Noel Fox.

In the windy conditions on the second day of the stroke-play competition, 109 players in the 132-man-field failed to broke 80, including future European Tour winners Henrik Stenson, Søren Hansen, Sergio Garcia, Maarten Lafeber, Peter Hanson, Grégory Havret, Jamie Donaldson and Martin Wiegele.

Team Spain won the gold medal, earning their first title, beating defending champions team Scotland in the final 4.5–2.5.

Host nation Ireland earned the bronze on third place, after beating Sweden 5.5–1.5 in the bronze match.

Results 
Qualification round

Team standings

* Note: In the event of a tie the order was determined by the best total of the two non-counting scores of the two rounds.

Individual leaders

 Note: There was no official award for the lowest individual score.

Flight A

Bracket

Final games

* Note: Game declared halved, since team match already decided.

Flight B

First round elimination matches

Second round elimination matches

Match for 15th place

Match for 13th place

Match for 11th place

Match for 9th place

Flight C

First round elimination matches

Second round elimination matches

Match for 21st place

Match for 19th place

Match for 17th place

Final standings

Sources:

See also
 Eisenhower Trophy – biennial world amateur team golf championship for men organized by the International Golf Federation.
 European Ladies' Team Championship – European amateur team golf championship for women organised by the European Golf Association.

References

External links 
 European Golf Association: Full results

European Amateur Team Championship
Golf tournaments in Ireland
European Amateur Team Championship
European Amateur Team Championship
European Amateur Team Championship